PK-huset (formerly PK-bankens hus) is a combined office and department store building at Hamngatan and Norrlandsgatan at Norrmalm in Stockholm. Nowadays, the Nordic finance group Nordea has its Swedish branch office in the building.

References

Buildings and structures in Stockholm
Office buildings in Sweden